John Victor Green (2 March 1885 – 27 May 1949) was an Australian rules footballer who played with Essendon in the Victorian Football League (VFL).

Notes

External links 

1885 births
1949 deaths
Australian rules footballers from Victoria (Australia)
Essendon Football Club players